Marc Rivière born on December 4, 1969, in Rennes, in the (Ille-et-Vilaine, 35) department of France. Is a French pastry chef at Potel et Chabot, whose pastry shop sits Chaillot, in Paris. He was crowned World Pastry Champion with the French team in 2009.

Biography
Marc grew up in Rennes with his family, and it's with his grandmother Marguerite, a butcher, that he started cooking, including his first salted butter caramel crêpes. From the age of four, he showed intentions of becoming a baker.

He enrolled in baking classes at the Rennes  trade school under Monsieur Joli. After graduating, he got a summer job under Chef Serge Nabucet who passed onto him his love for the profession. He worked there for three summers.

Work experience
 1990 1994 - Pastry Commis under Chef Pierre Hermé at Fauchon in Paris.
 1991 1994 - Dessert Chef de Partie, second in command under Chef Ralph Edeler at Harrod's, London.
 1992 1994 - Second in command under Chef Frédéric Gernez at Yves Thuriès, in Cordes-sur-ciel (81). 
 1994 - Pastry Chef at Fouquet's, Paris in France.
 1996 - Pastry Chef at Brigant(a caterer), now owned by Dalloyau.
 1999 - Sous Chef, then Pastry Chef at Potel et Chabot à Paris.

Contest
 1991 - 5th in the Charles Proust Junior Contest.
 1993 - 4th in the  Charles Proust Contest and Prize for Outstanding Taste.
 1994 - 3rd in the Mandarine Napoléon Contest and Prize for Outstanding Taste.
 2008 - Is selected to be part of the French Team for the World Pastry Cup 2009.
 2009 - World Pastry Champion with the French Team, also made up of Jérôme de Oliveira (captain) and Jérôme Langillier.

See also
 List of pastry chefs

References 

1969 births
French chefs
Living people
Pastry chefs